The 2015 South Florida Bulls football team represented the University of South Florida (USF) in the 2015 NCAA Division I FBS football season. The 2015 college football season was the 19th season for the Bulls, and their third as a member of the American Athletic Conference (The American), this season joining the newly formed East Division. They played their home games at Raymond James Stadium in Tampa, FL. They were led by Head Coach Willie Taggart, who was in his third year. They finished the season 8–5, 6–2 in American Athletic play to finish in second place in the East Division. They were invited to the Miami Beach Bowl where they lost to Western Kentucky.

Schedule

Game summaries

Florida A&M

at Florida State

at Maryland

Memphis

Syracuse

at UConn

SMU

at Navy

at East Carolina

Temple

Cincinnati

at UCF

WKU (Miami Beach Bowl)

References

South Florida
South Florida Bulls football seasons
South Florida Bulls football